Qaluyu (Aymara qala stone, uyu corral, "stone corral", also spelled Caluyo) is a  mountain in the Chilla-Kimsa Chata mountain range in the Andes of Bolivia. It is located in the La Paz Department, Ingavi Province, Tiwanaku Municipality. Qaluyu is situated south-west of Pukara (Pucara) and south-east of the archaeological site of Tiwanaku. The village of Qaluyu (Caluyo) lies at its feet.

References 

Mountains of La Paz Department (Bolivia)